Pulaparthi is one of 16 villages located in Yelamanchili Mandal, Anakapalli district, Andhra Pradesh, India. It had a recorded population of 2,744 in the 2011 census across its 747 households, and is now estimated to be between 2,662 and 3,293 in 2019/20. The oncoming 2021 census will provide official measurements.

References 

Villages in Anakapalli district